Heidi Kristina Blomstedt (née  Sibelius; Järvenpää, 20 June 1911 – Helsinki, 3 January 1982) was a Finnish designer.

She began her education in Helsinki, and later continued her studies at the Ateneum School of Art.

She graduated in ceramics at the Taik School of Art and Design in 1932, and worked as a freelance ceramist and for the Arabia company.

She married the architect Aulis Blomstedt, and they had four children: Juhana Blomstedt (1937–2010), Petri Blomstedt (1941–1997), Anssi Blomstedt (b. 1945) and Severi Blomstedt (b. 1946).

Her parents were the composer Jean Sibelius and Aino Sibelius.

Sources

External links 
 www.sibelius.fi

1911 births
1982 deaths
Finnish potters
20th-century Finnish women artists
20th-century ceramists
Finnish women ceramists
Sibelius family